Joseph Hellmesberger may refer to:

 Joseph Hellmesberger Sr. (1828–1893), Austrian violinist and conductor
 Joseph Hellmesberger Jr. (1855–1907), his son, Austrian composer, violinist and conductor